Gerard Cahir (born 25 August 1959) is a former Australian rules footballer who played with St Kilda in the Victorian Football League (VFL).

Notes

External links 

Living people
1959 births
Australian rules footballers from Victoria (Australia)
St Kilda Football Club players